Whitchurch Hospital was a psychiatric hospital in Whitchurch, an area in the north of Cardiff. It was managed by the Cardiff and Vale University Health Board. The hospital remains a grade II listed building. Its grounds are separately listed, also at Grade II, on the Cadw/ICOMOS Register of Parks and Gardens of Special Historic Interest in Wales.

History
The population of Cardiff had expanded greatly, from under 20,000 in 1851 to over 40,000 less than 20 years later. By 1890, there were 476 Cardiff residents "boarded out" in the Glamorgan Asylum, and a further 500 to 600 being held in hospitals as far away as Chester and Carmarthen.

Costing £350,000 and ten years to build, the Cardiff City Asylum opened on 15 April 1908. The main hospital building covered , designed to accommodate 750 patients across ten wards, five each for men and women. Like many Victorian institutes, it was designed as a self-contained institute, with its own  water tower atop a power house containing two Belliss and Morcom steam-engine powered electric generator sets, which were removed from standby in the mid-1980s. The site also contained a farm, which provided both food supplies and therapeutic work for patients.

The first medical superintendent was Edwin Goodall, whose then advanced approaches and therapies resulted in the hospital acquiring a reputation at the forefront of mental health care. Patients were also encouraged to take work and supervised tours outside the institute.

During the First World War, the facility was called the Welsh Metropolitan War Hospital. During the Second World War, part of the hospital was turned over to the military, becoming the largest emergency service hospital in South Wales, treating British, American and German personnel. There were 200 beds retained for civilian use, which enabled early treatment of post traumatic stress disorder of military patients.

On 5 July 1948, the hospital was taken over by the Ministry of Health when the National Health Service was founded. It was managed by the Whitchurch and Ely Hospital Management Committee, which also managed Ely Hospital, another large psychiatric hospital in Cardiff.

After the introduction of Care in the Community in the early 1980s the hospital went into a period of decline and the number of resident patients reduced.

The hospital was filmed in 2007 for the Torchwood episode From Out of the Rain, first broadcast on 12 March 2008.

In November 2010 the Cardiff and Vale University Health Board decided it was preferable to centralise all adult mental health care services at Llandough. The hospital closed in April 2016.

References

Towers completed in 1904
Hospital buildings completed in 1904
Former psychiatric hospitals in Wales
Hospitals in Cardiff
Hospitals established in 1904
Towers in Wales
Whitchurch, Cardiff
Registered historic parks and gardens in Cardiff